"Mirai no Museum" (Translation: "Future Museum") is a song by Japanese girl group Perfume from their fourth studio album Level 3 (2013). The song was released as the album's third single on 27 February 2013. It was written, composed and produced by Yasutaka Nakata. The song is a dance pop track, which features instrumentation from synthesizers and keyboards. The track is translated to "Future Museum" and was used as the theme song for the Doraemon film, Nobita no Himitsu Dougu Museum.

"Mirai no Museum" became their eighth consecutive single to stall at number two in Japan. The track became their first charting single in Korea since their 2011 single "Laser Beam/Kasuka na Kaori". Yusuke Tanaka commissioned the accompanying music video for the single, which shows Perfume inside a comic book–style world. Perfume have performed the song in a number of live performances throughout Japan.

Background and composition 
Japanese producer and Capsule musician Yasutaka Nakata wrote, arranged, and composed "Mirai no Museum". Nakata has collaborated with all of Perfume's records and songs from 2003 onwards. It was recorded in Tokyo, Japan and was mixed and mastered by Nakata. It is a dance and electropop song, and incorporates instrumentation of a drum machine, synthesizer and keyboards.

Reception
"Mirai no Museum" received mostly negative reviews from music critics. Writing for Land of Rising, Alex Shenmue said the song was one to skip. He felt that while the song was sung and produced well and catchy, “it doesn't fit the role of middle-section track in this album,” and “breaks the musical delivery.” He labelled it the “one true issue on the album.” Patrick St. Michael, writing for The Japan Times, said it was his least favorite single from the album and felt it was “painfully out of place.” Selective Hearings writer Nia labelled it a “dud” and “childish.” She said the song was the weakest and preferred their track "Hurly Burly" to replace the song, which was not featured on the album. A writer from CDJournal praised the “dreamy” and catchy production, but criticized the composition. Ian Martin, who had written their extended biography at Allmusic, had highlighted the song as an album and career standout.

The song charted in Japan, South Korea and Taiwan. Reaching number two on the Oricon Singles Chart, it became the group's eighth consecutive single to stall at number two. It was the group's last single to reach number two until their 2014 single "Cling Cling" reached the position and is their eleventh best-selling single there. The track also peaked at two on Japan Hot 100 chart. The song reached number twenty-three and thirteen in South Korea. The song was certified gold by the Recording Industry Association of Japan (RIAJ) for shipments of 100,000 units.

Release and promotion
Selected as the third single of Level 3, the song was released as an extended play digital download on 27 February 2013. Universal Music then released the single in the United Kingdom, New Zealand, Australia, Canada and the US. Two CD singles were issued; a standalone CD with all four songs, and a digipak that included a bonus DVD, a lyric sheet and a music video comic book.

"Mirai no Museum" was used as the ending theme song for the film Doraemon: Nobita no Himitsu Dōgu Museum, released in March 2013. Perfume debuted the track on Music Japan TV, where they sported the same outfit on the CD cover and performed the track. The group shot a promotional video for the film's release. The official music video was directed by Japanese director Yusuke Tanaka and premiered on Perfume's YouTube channel in June 2013. It features Perfume inside a comic book, trying to defeat a heavily armored warrior. They are accompanied by a mysterious mascot man, who tries to hide away from the warrior when it attacks.

Credits and personnel
Details adapted from the liner notes of the "Mirai no Museum" CD single.

Song credits
 Ayano Ōmoto (Nocchi) – vocals
 Yuka Kashino (Kashiyuka) – vocals
 Ayaka Nishiwaki (A-Chan) – vocals
 Yasutaka Nakata – producer, composer, arranger, mixing, mastering.

Visual credits
 Yusuke Tanaka – director
 Takahiko Kajima – video producer
 Kazunali Tajima – camera
 Tetsu Moridera – lighting director
 Mikiko – choreographer
 Shinichi Miter – stylist
 Masako Osuga – make-up
 Yuki Shhimajiri – hair stylist
 Drop – animation designer

Track listing

Charts, peaks and positions

Weekly charts

Certification

Release history

References

2013 singles
2013 songs
Japanese film songs
Japanese-language songs
Billboard Japan Hot 100 number-one singles
Perfume (Japanese band) songs
Songs written for animated films
Song recordings produced by Yasutaka Nakata
Songs written by Yasutaka Nakata
Universal J singles